Kathryn McDonald is an American scientist who is Bloomberg Distinguished Professor at the Johns Hopkins University. She serves as co-director of the Johns Hopkins Center for Diagnostic Excellence. McDonald previously led the Centre for Health Policy at Freeman Spogli Institute for International Studies. Her research considers what makes for high-quality and safe healthcare delivery systems.

Early life and education 
McDonald was an undergraduate student at Stanford University, where she majored in chemical engineering. She moved to the Kellogg School of Management for graduate studies, where she earned a Master of Management (MM) in 1992. She returned to Stanford University in the early 1990s, where she worked in the Medical School. McDonald eventually completed a doctorate in public health at the University of California, Berkeley in 2017. Her doctoral research looked at ambulatory care organizations and how they can help to improve the diagnosis of medical conditions. She was the member of a committee who found that the majority of United States physicians had made one faulty diagnosis. She estimated that over 12 million adults were misdiagnosed every year.

Research and career 
McDonald held various positions in the Stanford University School of Medicine. She founded and directed the Center for Primary Care and Outcomes Research. She develops tool measure patient safety and healthcare quality. She created healthcare quality measurements (so-called quality indicators) which collect and analyze data from hospitals. She was awarded the Society for Medical Decision Making Saenger Distinguished Service Award in 2007. She has investigated the ways that a patient's protected characteristics (including age, gender and race) contribute to errors in medical diagnoses. She has also studied how the time constraints placed on nurses and clinicians impacts patient safety.

In 2019, McDonald was appointed a Bloomberg Distinguished Professor at the Johns Hopkins University. During the COVID-19 pandemic McDonald studied healthcare worker protection and the decision making process.

Selected publications

References 

Johns Hopkins University faculty
Stanford University alumni
Year of birth missing (living people)
Living people